The 2005 Florida Gators football team represented the University of Florida in the sport of American football during the 2005 college football season.  The Gators competed in Division I-A of the National Collegiate Athletic Association (NCAA) and the Eastern Division of the Southeastern Conference (SEC), and played their home games at Ben Hill Griffin Stadium on the university's Gainesville, Florida campus.  The season was the team's first of six under head coach Urban Meyer, who led the Gators to an Outback Bowl berth and an overall win–loss record of 9–3 (.750).

Pre-season

The 2005 season would open with high expectations of new head coach Urban Meyer.  Fourteen starters, seven from offense and seven from defense, would return for the 2005 season.  The Gators would open the season in Gainesville against Wyoming from the Mountain West Conference.  This year would also be the first time former Gator coach Steve Spurrier would coach against his alma mater.

Schedule

Sources: 2012 Florida Football Media Guide, and GatorZone.com.

Game summaries

Wyoming

Louisiana Tech

Tennessee

Kentucky

Alabama

Mississippi State

LSU

Georgia

Vanderbilt

South Carolina

Florida State

Iowa
Outback Bowl

Coaching staff 

 Urban Meyer – Head Coach – first year at UF
 Steve Addazio – Tackles/tight ends – first year
 Stan Drayton – Running backs – first year
 Billy Gonzales – Wide receivers – first year
 Chuck Heater – Recruiting coordinator/cornerbacks – first year
 John Hevesy – Centers/guards – 0 years
 John "Doc" Holliday – Associate head coach/safeties – first year
 Greg Mattison – Co-defensive coordinator/defensive line – first year
 Dan Mullen – Offensive coordinator/quarterbacks – first year
 Charlie Strong – Assistant head coach/co-defensive coordinator/linebackers – sixth year

Players drafted into the NFL

References

Bibliography
 2009 Southeastern Conference Football Media Guide, Florida Year-by-Year Records, Southeastern Conference, Birmingham, Alabama, p. 60 (2009).
 Carlson, Norm, University of Florida Football Vault: The History of the Florida Gators, Whitman Publishing, LLC, Atlanta, Georgia (2007).  .

Florida
Florida Gators football seasons
ReliaQuest Bowl champion seasons
Florida Gators football